Świebodzin is a town in Lubusz Voivodeship (west Poland).

Świebodzin may also refer to:

Świebodzin, Dąbrowa County in Lesser Poland Voivodeship (south Poland)
Świebodzin, Tarnów County in Lesser Poland Voivodeship (south Poland)